North Frisian Barrier Island is the collective term for three barrier islands (outer shoals) due west of the German Halligen in the North Frisian Islands archipelago. The shoals act as natural breakwater for the Halligen and other islands closer to land. Uninhabited, they remain one of the few areas in the Wadden Sea that are unaffected by direct human activity.

The shoals from north to south are:

The shoals are subject to constant change and are slowly moving towards the mainland coast to the east. This changes both their location and surface area. During the last 50 years, all three shoals benefitted from their increasing area but their individual development was very diverse. In total, 43.5 million m3 of sand were eroded by wind and water on the west coasts of the shoals, whereas 32.4 million m3 were deposited at the eastern shorelines. Especially Japsand, which is the youngest and smallest of the three shoals, could thereby gain volume and was the fastest moving shoal. Numerical simulations by the University of Kiel have shown the likelihood of a merger between Japsand and Norderoogsand by 2050. This would cover Hallig Norderoog in sand, as well as large areas of mudflats which are still east of the sands as of today.

The peak heights of the shoals reach about one metre above the average high tide. In summer, the dry sand is sometimes piled to dunes of several metres height. These are occasionally settled by Elymus grasses. Since 1999 though, an increasingly stable and diverse vegetation has been observed at the northern edge of Norderoogsand. The plant carpet helps to accumulate ever more sand, and so the peak dune of Norderoogsand was recorded with 3.50 metres in 2013. Because of this development, Norderoogsand has been called a new island.

All three shoals are nature reserves and constitute an important resting area for migratory birds, harbour seals, and grey seals. Together with the Hooger Loch and Rummelloch-West gats, as well the Halligen of Norderoog and Süderoog, the shoals are a popular resort for seals and form one of the main moulting areas of the common eider.

The shoals are part of the core zone of the Schleswig-Holstein Wadden Sea National Park and must not be entered except for the northern areas of Japsand. In 1985, a light beacon was erected on Süderoogsand on a wooden framework. The device is solar powered and has a shelter for shipwrecked sailors.

Gallery

References

North Frisian Islands
New islands
Barrier islands